The Frank Boutin Jr. House is a historic single dwelling in Bayfield, Wisconsin, United States. The property was added to the National Register of Historic Places on December 27, 1974.

History
The house was built in 1908 by Frank Boutin Jr. in the Queen Anne style architecture which is exemplified by its sweeping porches, corner turret, dormer windows, and complex gable roof. Boutin Jr. lived in the house for only a few years before moving to Idaho, where he was successful in the lumber industry.

Present
The house has been restored by its current owners and is now run as a bed and breakfast called Le Chateau Boutin.

References

Houses in Bayfield County, Wisconsin
Houses completed in 1908
Houses on the National Register of Historic Places in Wisconsin
Tourist attractions in Bayfield County, Wisconsin
National Register of Historic Places in Bayfield County, Wisconsin
1908 establishments in Wisconsin
Bayfield, Wisconsin
Queen Anne architecture in Wisconsin